Karin Tanabe is a historical fiction novelist who is best known for her works The Gilded Years: A Novel, a novel about the first African-American graduate of Vassar College, and The Diplomat's Daughter: A Novel, a love story set in a Japanese American internment camp. National Public Radio has described her as a "master of historical fiction".

Biography

Tanabe is a first-generation American who grew up in Washington, D.C. with foreign parents. Her father Kunio Francis Tanabe is from Yokohama and is the former Book World art director and senior editor at the Washington Post. Tanabe holds American and Belgian passports and speaks French and English.

Tanabe graduated from Vassar College and currently lives in Washington, D.C. with her husband, daughter, and son. Until 2017, she was a reporter at Politico.

List of works
 The List: A Novel (2013) - a novel about a young reporter inspired by Tanabe's experiences at Politico
 The Price of Inheritance: A Novel (2014) - a drama set in the high-end antique furniture world
 The Gilded Years: A Novel (2016) - a historical fiction novel about the first African-American graduate of Vassar College
 The Diplomat's Daughter (2017) - a love story set in a Japanese American internment camp
 A Hundred Suns: A Novel (2020) - a thriller set in 1930s French Indochina
 A Woman of Intelligence (2021) - Cold War spy novel

References

Living people
American writers of Japanese descent
American women writers of Asian descent
21st-century American women writers
American historical fiction writers
Vassar College alumni
Year of birth missing (living people)